Haralambos Syngellakis (1935–1986) was a Greek chess player, Greek Chess Championship winner (1958).

Biography
From the end of 1950s Haralambos Syngellakis was one of Greek leading chess players. In 1958 he won Greek Chess Championship.

Haralambos Syngellakis played for Greece in the Chess Olympiad:
 In 1958, at first board in the 13th Chess Olympiad in Munich (+0, =0, -3).

There is no information about the further chess activity of Haralambos Syngellakis.

References

External links

1935 births
1986 deaths
Greek chess players
Chess Olympiad competitors
20th-century Greek people